The Louisiana and Arkansas Railway  was a railroad that operated in the states of Arkansas, Louisiana, and Texas.  The railroad's main line extended 332 miles, from Hope, Arkansas to Shreveport and New Orleans.  Branch lines served Vidalia, Louisiana (opposite Natchez, Mississippi), and Dallas, Texas.

History

The Louisiana and Arkansas Railroad was incorporated in Arkansas in 1898 for the purpose of acquiring former logging railroad properties in Arkansas and Louisiana. The railroad was constructed and initially operated under the leadership of William Buchanan, a prosperous timberman with extensive investments in southwest Arkansas and northwest Louisiana. Buchanan's partners were Harvey C. Couch and William C. Edenborn. Buchanan's primary company, Bodcaw Lumber Company, was headquartered in Stamps, Arkansas, and that city also served as headquarters of the L&A until the late 1920s. It was reorganized in 1902 as the Louisiana and Arkansas Railway.

1910

In 1910, the L&A Railway and Arkansas Southern Railroad were involved in a dispute over Louisiana taxes, a notable court case which ultimately was heard by the U.S. Supreme Court.

1920s
During the late 1920s, a group of investors led by Harvey Couch began acquiring Louisiana & Arkansas stock. These investors owned electric and telephone utilities in Arkansas and Louisiana and believed that railroad ownership in their service area would also be profitable.  When control of the L&A was thus secured on January 16, 1928, a new company was chartered in Delaware in 1928 to acquire the former Louisiana and Arkansas Railway Company, and to acquire and lease the Louisiana Railway and Navigation Company, that operated a marginally profitable railroad between New Orleans and Shreveport.

The L&A inaugurated a new premier passenger train, The Shreveporter, on December 30, 1928, operating between Shreveport and Hope, Arkansas.  This train carried a through Pullman sleeping car between Shreveport and St. Louis, Missouri, in conjunction with Missouri Pacific Railroad.  A second named passenger train, The Hustler, was added to provide overnight service between Shreveport and New Orleans, beginning on July 2, 1932.

1930s
The Harvey Couch interests began purchasing stock of the Kansas City Southern Railway (KCS) in 1937.  After gaining control of the KCS in 1939, a decision was made to merge the two properties.  Kansas City Southern was the surviving corporation, with the Louisiana & Arkansas as a KCS subsidiary, but the KCS president and the controlling stockholders were all from the L&A.  This merger created "single line" railroad freight service between Kansas City and New Orleans, and on September 2, 1940, a new KCS-L&A diesel powered streamliner, the Southern Belle, was inaugurated to connect the two cities.

1940s
In 1948, in a letter to Ernest W. Roberts, Harry Truman described the difficult working conditions for certain black workers  employed by this railroad.

1950s
The worst wreck in the history of the L&A occurred on August 10, 1951, when a northbound L&A troop train collided head-on with the southbound Southern Belle just north of Lettsworth, Louisiana; Lettsworth is located approximately 55 miles northwest of Baton Rouge, on a segment of the Texas and Pacific Railway over which L&A trains had operating rights.  The troop train was traveling 40 mph (64 km/h) and the Southern Belle was moving at the maximum speed limit of 55 mph (89 km/h) when the collision occurred on a long curve where vegetation obscured visibility.  Thirteen people were killed, and another eighty-two were injured.  It was determined that the accident had occurred because the troop train had overlooked a train order to wait in a siding at Lettsworth to allow the passenger train to pass.

1950- 1960

The identity of the Louisiana & Arkansas gradually disappeared in the 1950s and 1960s, as the Kansas City Southern name was adopted for all properties.  By 1966, all reference to the Louisiana & Arkansas had disappeared from the annual stockholder reports of Kansas City Southern.  The Shreveporter, once the pride of the L&A, was discontinued on January 24, 1962, and the Southern Belle was discontinued on November 2, 1969, ending all passenger train service on the former Louisiana & Arkansas.

1990s
In 1992, Kansas City Southern dissolved the subsidiary Louisiana & Arkansas Railway, although the former L&A route continues to be a major component of the Kansas City Southern.

References

Bibliography

External links

Texas Handbook Online-L&A Ry.
Interstate Commerce Commission Accident Report No. 3419

Former Class I railroads in the United States
Defunct Arkansas railroads
Defunct Louisiana railroads
Predecessors of the Kansas City Southern Railway
Railway companies established in 1902
Railway companies disestablished in 1992
Defunct Texas railroads